Solnechny is a rural locality (a settlement) in Zabuzansky Selsoviet, Krasnoyarsky District, Astrakhan Oblast, Russia. The population was 217 as of 2010. There are 2 streets.

Geography 
It is located on the Buzan River, 9 km southwest of Krasny Yar (the district's administrative centre) by road. Zabuzan is the nearest rural locality.

References 

Rural localities in Krasnoyarsky District, Astrakhan Oblast